The Northern smoothtongue (Leuroglossus schmidti) is a type of deepwater fish that can grow to a length of  TL.

References 

Bathylagidae
Fish of the Pacific Ocean
Fish of the United States
Fish of Mexican Pacific coast
Fish described in 1955